London is an unincorporated community in Moral Township, Shelby County, in the U.S. state of Indiana.

History
London was platted in 1852 when the railroad was extended to that point. The community took its name from London, the capital of England. A post office was established at London in 1854, and remained in operation until it was discontinued in 1959.

On September 9, 1969, Allegheny Airlines Flight 853 on a Boston – Baltimore – Cincinnati – Indianapolis – St. Louis route, collided in midair with a Piper Cherokee during its descent over Fairland, Indiana in Shelby County. The McDonnell Douglas DC-9-31 crashed into a cornfield near London, killing all 78 passengers and 4 crew members on board. The student pilot who was flying the Cherokee was also killed.

Geography

References

Unincorporated communities in Shelby County, Indiana
Unincorporated communities in Indiana